The Toronto Rock are a lacrosse team based in Hamilton, Ontario playing in the National Lacrosse League (NLL). The 2023 season is the 25th in franchise history, and 24th as the Rock.

Regular season

Final standings

Game log

Regular season

Roster

Entry Draft
The 2022 NLL Entry Draft took place on September 10, 2022. The Toronto Rock made the following selections:

References

Toronto
Toronto Rock